Nakina Outpost Camps and Air Service is a small Canadian airline based in Nakina, Ontario.

Fleet 
Currently, the Nakina Air Service fleet consists of 4 aircraft:

Former fleet:
Cessna 208B
Pilatus PC-12
DHC-6 Twin Otter

References 

Regional airlines of Ontario
Seaplane operators